Ambano is a town and commune in Madagascar. It belongs to the district of Antsirabe II, which is a part of Vakinankaratra Region. The population of the commune was estimated to be approximately 32,000 in the 2001 commune census.

Primary and junior level secondary education are available in the town. 95% of the population of the commune are farmers, while the remaining 5% receive their livelihood from raising livestock. The most important crops are vegetables and fruits, along with citrus fruits and potatoes.

References and notes 

Populated places in Vakinankaratra